Parnell is an unincorporated community in Atchison County, Kansas, United States.

History
Parnell was platted in 1883. It was named for James L. Parnell, a member of the 13th Kansas Militia Infantry Regiment, who was killed in the Civil War.

Parnell had a post office from 1883 until 1923.

References

Further reading

External links
 Atchison County maps: Current, Historic, KDOT

Unincorporated communities in Atchison County, Kansas
Unincorporated communities in Kansas
1883 establishments in Kansas
Populated places established in 1883